Lars Krogh Jeppesen (born 5 March 1979) is a former Danish handball left back, who played for KIF Kolding and previous Danish national team.  He has won the 2008 European Men's Handball Championship along with two bronze medals in 2004 and 2002. He played for German top clubs SG Flensburg-Handewitt and THW Kiel. He also played two seasons for Spanish FC Barcelona.

Trophies

Club team
Spanish Champion: 2006 FC Barcelona Handbol
EHF Champions League: 2007 THW Kiel, 2005 FC Barcelona Handbol
German Bundesliga: 2007 THW Kiel, 2004 SG Flensburg-Handewitt
DHB-Cup: 2007 THW Kiel, 2004, 2003 SG Flensburg-Handewitt
EHF Cup Winner's Cup: 2001 SG Flensburg-Handewitt

National team
Junior World Champion: 1999
Junior European Champion: 1998
European Championship: Gold: 2008, bronze: 2004, 2002

References

External links
THW Kiel profile

1979 births
Living people
Danish male handball players
KIF Kolding players
Danish expatriate sportspeople in Spain
Danish expatriate sportspeople in Germany
People from Hvidovre Municipality
Sportspeople from the Capital Region of Denmark